Lee and Penny Anderson Arena is a proposed indoor arena located in Saint Paul, Minnesota. The facility is planned to be the home arena of the University of St. Thomas basketball and hockey teams.

History

In 2020, St. Thomas received approval to move its athletics programs directly from NCAA Division III to NCAA Division I as a result of being removed from the Minnesota Intercollegiate Athletic Conference. At the time, it was noted that athletics facilities would need to be assessed, due to Division I's elevated requirements. Continued use of existing facilities, leasing other facilities, or building new facilities were all listed as options. Since 2003, St. Thomas' men's and women's hockey teams have played at St. Thomas Ice Arena in Mendota Heights. With a capacity of just 1,000, it is the third-smallest arena in Division I men's hockey.

In February 2022, St. Thomas offered $61.4 million to purchase nearby Town & Country Club, with the intent to build athletic facilities on the site. The country club's board of directors voted to reject the offer.

In June 2022, it was reported that the university planned to build sports facilities, including a new hockey arena, at the former Ford Motor Company Twin Cities Assembly Plant redevelopment site known as Highland Bridge. In July 2022, St. Thomas announced it no longer planned to build a hockey arena at the Highland Bridge site and would focus on on-campus locations.

On January 17, 2023, St. Thomas announced that it had received a $75 million gift from Lee and Penny Anderson to construct a multiuse on-campus arena in St. Paul. With a total project cost estimated to be $175 million, the arena would be home to St. Thomas' basketball and hockey teams. The arena would also host commencement, speakers, career fairs, and other events for the broader community, such as concerts. Several buildings will need to be demolished to make room for the arena, including Cretin Hall, a dormitory designed by Cass Gilbert and built in 1894.

Design

The arena will feature a Gothic architectural style similar to many other buildings on campus.

It will be designed such that quick conversions can be made between hockey, basketball and other events. The complex will also house basketball and hockey practice facilities, including a second ice sheet. 

LEED Silver certification will be sought, a sustainability benchmark for green building certification.

References

College ice hockey venues in the United States
Proposed indoor arenas in the United States
Indoor ice hockey venues in Minnesota
Buildings and structures in Saint Paul, Minnesota
St. Thomas (Minnesota) Tommies men's basketball
St. Thomas (Minnesota) Tommies men's ice hockey
St. Thomas (Minnesota) Tommies women's ice hockey